The Luxembourg Open, currently sponsored by BGL, is a women's tennis tournament held in Kockelscheuer, Luxembourg.  Held since 1991, the tournament was an exhibition event (winners including Novotná, Navratilova and Appelmans) until 1995.  After that, it became a WTA Tier III tournament, which it remained until 2004.  In 2005, it was promoted to Tier II, marking the first such event to be held in Luxembourg.  In 2008, the tournament was relegated to a Tier III event, before it became an International Series tournament in 2009.

Kim Clijsters of Belgium holds the record of most singles wins: 5 (1999, 2001, 2002, 2003, 2005).  No other player has won more than twice.

Past finals

Singles

Doubles

See also
 List of tennis tournaments

Footnotes

External links

 Luxembourg Open official website

 
Tennis tournaments in Luxembourg
Indoor tennis tournaments
Hard court tennis tournaments
WTA Tour
Kockelscheuer
Recurring sporting events established in 1991
Autumn events in Luxembourg
1991 establishments in Luxembourg